Fra' John Timothy Dunlap (born April 16, 1957) is the Lieutenant of the Grand Master and head of the Sovereign Military Order of Malta since 13 June 2022.

Education and career
Dunlap was born in Ottawa, Ontario, Canada. He received a Bachelor of Arts degree from the University of Ottawa and a Juris Doctor degree from the University of Western Ontario. He also studied at the University of Nice.

Dunlap is admitted to the New York State Bar Association and the Ontario Bar Association. In 1986 he joined the New York legal firm Dunnington, Bartholow & Miller. He became a partner in 1993. He specializes in corporate and immigration law.  He is legal advisor to the Permanent Observer of the Holy See to the United Nations.

Order of Malta
Dunlap was admitted as a Knight of Magistral Grace of the Order of Malta in 1996.  He professed temporary vows as a Knight of Justice in 2004. On 7 June 2008 he professed perpetual vows as a Knight of Justice at the Church of St. Joseph in Greenwich Village. In 2006 he was elected the first regent, or religious superior, of the Sub-Priory of Our Lady of Lourdes, which is composed of knights of the first and second classes who are members of the American Association and the Federal Association.

In May 2014 Dunlap was elected to a five-year term as a member of the Sovereign Council.  He also serves as president of the Committee on the Orders of St. John, set up as a collaborative body between the Order of Malta and the four non-Catholic orders of St. John.

On 13 June 2022 Pope Francis appointed Dunlap Lieutenant of the Grand Master of the Order.

Charitable activities
Dunlap is President Emeritus of the Canadian Club of New York, Vice-President of the Royal Conservatory of Music Foundation (Toronto), a Trustee of John Cabot University (Rome), and President of the Friends of the Certosa di Capri (Italy).

Arms

Notes

Knights of Malta
1957 births
Living people
Lieutenants of the Sovereign Military Order of Malta